Cymatosirales is an order of diatoms in the superorder Cymatosirophycidae.

References

External links 

 
 Cymatosirales at WorMS

 
Diatom orders